Patriarch Meletios Euthymius III of Chios (died 11 October 1647), sometimes known also as Euthymius IV, was Melkite Greek Patriarch of Antioch from 1635 to 1647.

Life

Meletios was born from a family originally from Chios and he entered in the Mar Saba monastery of which he became hieromonk. He was known as painter of icons and thus he was called to Damascus to paint the Melkite cathedral.
His name as Patriarch was suggested by the dying Patriarch Euthymius II Karmah, and shortly after Karmah's death (1 January 1635) Meletios was accordingly elected. His episcopal and patriarchal consecration was performed by Philotheos of Homs, Simeon of Saidnaya and Joachim of Zabadani and he took the name of Euthymius III.

He is remembered as "timid" Patriarch, and he had not the courage of his predecessor. His relationships with the Latin missionaries in Syria were very good even if he never wrote directly to the pope. He died of illness in Damascus on 11 October 1647.

Notes

1647 deaths
Greek Orthodox Patriarchs of Antioch
17th-century Greek clergy
Clergy from Chios
Year of birth unknown